HD 157661 is the Henry Draper Catalogue designation for a likely triple star in the southern constellation of Ara. The combined apparent visual magnitude of the stars is 5.29, which means it is faintly visible to the naked eye.

The inner components of this system consist of a pair of B-type main sequence stars. The brighter star has a magnitude of 5.70 and a stellar classification of B7 V. At an angular separation of 2.115 arcseconds is the magnitude 6.46 secondary component, which has a classification of B9.5 V. A third member of the system is a 7.6 magnitude A-type star at a separation of 103 arcseconds.

References

External links 
 VizieR Detailed Page: HR 6477 Hoffleit, D., Warren, Jr., W. H., (1991). The Bright Star Catalogue, (5th Revised Ed), CDS.
 VizieR Detailed Page: CCDM 17268-4550 Dommanget J., (2002) Catalog of Components of Double & Multiple stars, CDS. 
 Aladin previewer: Image of SV* ZI 1312

Ara (constellation)
157661
Triple stars
B-type main-sequence stars
A-type main-sequence stars
6477
Durchmusterung objects
085389